The 1989 Cornell Big Red football team was an American football team that represented Cornell University during the 1989 NCAA Division I-AA football season. Cornell tied for second-to-last in the Ivy League. 

In its first and only season under head coach Jack Fouts, the team compiled a 4–6 record and was outscored 194 to 158. Drew Fraser and Mitch Lee were the team captains. 

Cornell's 2–5 conference record earned a three-way tie for fifth in the Ivy League standings. The Big Red was outscored 142 to 114 by Ivy opponents. 

Cornell played its home games at Schoellkopf Field in Ithaca, New York.

Schedule

References

Cornell
Cornell Big Red football seasons
Cornell Big Red football